Valentino Pellarini (26 October 1919 – 15 May 1992) was an Italian basketball player. He competed in the men's tournament at the 1948 Summer Olympics.

References

1919 births
1992 deaths
Italian men's basketball players
Olympic basketball players of Italy
Basketball players at the 1948 Summer Olympics
Sportspeople from Koper